Ticetonyk Mountain is a mountain located in the Catskill Mountains of New York southeast of Phoenicia. Tremper Mountain is located northwest, and Tonshi Mountain is located east of Ticetonyk Mountain.

References

Mountains of Ulster County, New York
Mountains of New York (state)